The LogSumExp (LSE) (also called RealSoftMax or multivariable softplus) function is a smooth maximum – a smooth approximation to the maximum function, mainly used by machine learning algorithms. It is defined as the logarithm of the sum of the exponentials of the arguments:

Properties 
It is an approximation to the maximum  with the following bounds

The first inequality is strict unless .  The second inequality is strict unless all arguments are equal.
(Proof: Let .  Then .  Applying the logarithm to the inequality gives the result.)

In addition, we can scale the function to make the bounds tighter.  Consider the function .  Then 

and, since 

finally, dividing by  gives the result.)

Also, if we multiply by a negative number instead, we of course find a comparison to the  function:

The LogSumExp function is convex, and is strictly increasing everywhere in its domain (but not strictly convex everywhere).

Writing  the partial derivatives are:

which means the gradient of LogSumExp is the softmax function.

The convex conjugate of LogSumExp is the negative entropy.

log-sum-exp trick for log-domain calculations
The LSE function is often encountered when the usual arithmetic computations are performed on a logarithmic scale, as in log probability.

Similar to multiplication operations in linear-scale becoming simple additions in log-scale, an addition operation in
linear-scale becomes the LSE in log-scale:

A common purpose of using log-domain computations is to increase accuracy and avoid underflow and overflow problems
when very small or very large numbers are represented directly (i.e. in a linear domain) using limited-precision
floating point numbers.

Unfortunately, the use of LSE directly in this case can again cause overflow/underflow problems. Therefore, the
following equivalent must be used instead (especially when the accuracy of the above 'max' approximation is not sufficient).
Therefore, many math libraries such as IT++ provide a default routine of LSE and use this formula internally.

where

A strictly convex log-sum-exp type function 

LSE is convex but not strictly convex.
We can define a  strictly convex log-sum-exp type function by adding an extra argument set to zero:

This function is a proper Bregman generator (strictly convex and differentiable). 
It is encountered in machine learning, for example, as the cumulant of the multinomial/binomial family.

In tropical analysis, this is the sum in the log semiring.

See also 
 Logarithmic mean
 Log semiring
 Smooth maximum
 Softmax function

References 

  

Logarithms